Latirus polygonus, the short-tailed latirus,  is a species of sea snail, a marine gastropod mollusc in the family Fasciolariidae, the spindle snails, the tulip snails and their allies.

Description
The shell size varies between 25 mm and 105 mm

Distribution
This species is distributed in the Red Sea and in the Indian Ocean along Tanzania, Aldabra, Chagos, Madagascar, the Mascarene Basin and in the Western Pacific Ocean

References

 Drivas, J. & M. Jay (1988). Coquillages de La Réunion et de l'île Maurice
 Dautzenberg, Ph. (1929). Mollusques testaces marins de Madagascar. Faune des Colonies Francaises, Tome III

External links
 

Fasciolariidae
Gastropods described in 1791